Siru Airistola (born 24 September 1987), known professionally as Siru, is a Finnish singer who won the third edition of The Voice of Finland in 2014. She competed in Uuden Musiikin Kilpailu 2015 with the song "Mustelmat" in an attempt to represent Finland in the Eurovision Song Contest 2015, but was eliminated in the second heat.

Siru's debut album Solmut was released in February 2015.

Siru writes music to other artists too. Siru's single Läpikulkumatkalla was a part of a campaigne "Koko Suomi Tanssii" in 2017. Siru released her newest single "The Light" in 2018. At the moment Siru is working on a new release which will be released in the beginning of 2019.

Discography

Studio albums 
 Your Impression (2013)
 Solmut (2015)

Singles

References 

1987 births
Living people
21st-century Finnish women singers
People from Vaasa
Finnish pop singers
Musicians from Tampere
The Voice (franchise) winners